Chemical Chords is the ninth studio album by English-French rock band Stereolab, released on 18 August 2008 by 4AD and Duophonic Records.

Track listing

Personnel
Credits are adapted from the album's liner notes.

Stereolab
 Tim Gane – guitar, bass, drums
 Lætitia Sadier – vocals
 Simon Johns – bass
 Andy Ramsay – drums, drum machine, electronics
 Joe Walters – French horn
 Joe Watson – keyboards, vibraphone, electronics, drums

Additional musicians
 Steve Hamilton – brass
 Sally Herbert – strings
 Marcus Holdaway – strings
 Dave Liddell – brass
 Laura Melhuish – strings
 Sean O'Hagan – string and brass arrangements
 Brian Wright – strings

Production
 Bo Kondren (credited as "Bo") – mastering
 Hans Schaaf (credited as "Hans") – mastering (assistant)
 Stereolab (credited as "The Groop") – mixing
 Joe Watson – mixing, recording

Design
 House – artwork

Charts

References

External links
 
 

2008 albums
Stereolab albums
4AD albums